Osmond Brian Jackson (6 April 1931 – 2 July 2022) was a British actor, photographer and producer who was especially famous  as "The Man from Del Monte".

Life and career
Jackson was born on 6 April 1931 in Bolton, Lancashire, England. He began his career as a Fleet Air Arm photographer and cameraman, then spent many years in the theatre appearing in the plays with repertory seasons at the Old Vic and the Royal Shakespeare Company at Stratford-upon-Avon and London.  In 1969–70, he appeared in Mame at the Theatre Royal, Drury Lane, starring Ginger Rogers.

He was a regular actor on TV and BBC radio drama. For several years Jackson was exclusively contracted worldwide as The Man From Del Monte, filming 25 commercials shown in 32 countries.

In addition to his acting career, Jackson owned and ran several TV production and international distribution companies from his photographic, film & recording studios at Hampden Gurney Studios complex at Marble Arch in London.

Jackson was married to, and divorced from, Irene Berry, and they had a son and daughter. He also had a daughter with Eunice Gayson, to whom he was married from 1968 to 1977. He was married to Ann Barker from 1998 until his death. They had a daughter, and he had another son from another relationship.

Jackson died from prostate cancer in London on 2 July 2022, at the age of 91.

Filmography

References

External links 
Brian Jackson Films
Brian Jackson at the British Film Institute
 

1931 births
2022 deaths
20th-century English male actors
Actors from Bolton
English male film actors
English male television actors
English male musical theatre actors
Deaths from cancer in England
Deaths from prostate cancer